Strategic alignment is a process that ensures an organization's structure, use of resources (and culture) support its strategy. "In its simplest form, organizational strategic alignment is lining up a business' strategy with its culture." Successful outcomes also require an awareness of the wider environment, regulatory issues and technological change. Strategic alignment contributes to improved performance by optimizing the operation of processes/systems, and the activities of teams and departments. Goal-setting theory supports the relevance of clear, measurable operational objectives that can be linked to superordinate goals. This helps ensure resources are used effectively.  

The concept of strategic alignment is significant in the context of a global business environment where activities need to be coordinated across regions and time zones. Strategic alignment encompasses not only technical and functional activities, but also  issues relating to human resource management (and how best to develop people's motivation and capability). Studies suggest that the alignment of business strategy and HR strategy can impact performance. The process may extend across organizations and groups that share complementary objectives, e.g. business partners. It has also been found that coalignment of business strategy, business structure, IT strategy, and IT structure contributes to performance.

Superordinate Principles 
Creating operational alignment involves translating an organization's Superordinate Goals and overall strategy into the more immediate objectives of a team or department. In addition to reviewing systems and processes, leaders also need to develop the skills, competencies and motivation of people in the organization. The McKinsey 7s Framework provides an overview of this type of analysis, highlighting elements that contribute to alignment. This type of review, with follow-up interventions, contribute to key activities (linked to products and services) meeting customer and stakeholder expectations. At the same time, effective internal systems ensure the best use of resources, which contributes to future success.

Strategic Alignment requires awareness of Superordinate Principles that may include the 3BL "triple bottom line" perspective. This emphasizes criteria that take account of Planet, People & Profit (3P Thinking). It raises issues relating to Corporate Governance, which now include social and environmental considerations. KPMG make the point: "Businesses not taking ESG seriously are beginning to lose customers, employees and financing; eventually they will become unviable." 

There are two main models of corporate governance, (i) the shareholder model, which prioritizes the return on investment for investors, and (ii) the stakeholder model that also emphasizes a  responsibility towards other groups and wider considerations. Guiding principles relating to Environmental, Social and Corporate Governance (ESG) is at the heart of the new thinking.

Trevor and Varcoe 
In an article in Harvard Business Review (May 2016), Jonathan Trevor and Barry Varcoe suggest two questions. These prompt reflection on strategic alignment.

 How well does your business strategy support the fulfilment of your company’s purpose?
 How well does your organization support the achievement of your business strategy?
Findings suggest that both elements contribute to performance. The article notes that (alignment) 'also leads to a more positive work climate, above-average staff engagement, a strong commitment to values and few(er) energy-sapping turf wars and in-fighting'. (ibid)

See also 
Superordinate Goals that are linked to an organization's Vision and Mission Statement
Strategy Markup Language (StratML), whose purposes include facilitating strategic alignment through the establishment of literal linkages among performance indicators and the strategic goals and objectives they support.
Environmental scanning
Competition
Sustainability reporting
Business strategy alignment and the secrets of strategic planning

References 

United States Office of Personnel Management's overview of strategic alignment in the context of human capital management
ARMA International's discussion of strategic alignment in the context of records and information management, July/August 2007
Articles on strategic alignment provided by Resource Management Systems, Inc.
Strategy 101: It's All About Alignment, Forbes, October 16, 2012
Strategic alignment of business processes, E. D. Morrison, A. K. Ghose, H. K. Dam, K. G. Hinge, K. Hoesch-Klohe, University of Wollongong, December 5, 2011
The Case for Strategic Alignment, white paper by The Knowledge Compass, Inc.

Organizational performance management